Tennessee's 11th Senate district is one of 33 districts in the Tennessee Senate. It has been represented by Republican Bo Watson since 2006.

Geography
District 11 is based in the northern suburbs of Chattanooga in Hamilton County, including some of the city proper as well as Soddy-Daisy, Collegedale, Middle Valley, Signal Mountain, Harrison, and part of Red Bank.

The district is located entirely within Tennessee's 3rd congressional district, and overlaps with the 26th, 27th, 28th, 29th, and 30th districts of the Tennessee House of Representatives.

Recent election results
Tennessee Senators are elected to staggered four-year terms, with odd-numbered districts holding elections in midterm years and even-numbered districts holding elections in presidential years.

2018

2014

Federal and statewide results in District 11

References 

11
Hamilton County, Tennessee